Thomas Lewis (fl. 1528–1559), of Wells, Somerset was an English politician.

He was a Member (MP) of the Parliament of England for Wells in October 1553, April 1554, November 1554 and 1555.

References

16th-century deaths
People from Wells, Somerset
Year of birth uncertain
English MPs 1553 (Mary I)
English MPs 1554
English MPs 1554–1555
English MPs 1555